The Hero Trilogy consists of the 3 singles: Tragic Hero, Fallen Hero, and Arising Hero.

With the release of Blutzoll, Funker Vogt have completed their 'Hero Trilogy'. It began with Tragic Hero on the album Execution Tracks, continued with Fallen Hero from Navigator, and was concluded in 2010 with Arising Hero. All 3 parts of the trilogy were released as promotional singles.

Tragic Hero

"Tragic Hero" (1998) is an aggrotech single by Funker Vogt. It is the first part of the Hero Trilogy.

Track listing

Fallen Hero

"Fallen Hero" (2005) is an aggrotech single by Funker Vogt. It is the second part of the Hero Trilogy

Track listing

Arising Hero

"Arising Hero" (2010) is an aggrotech single by Funker Vogt. It is the third and final part of the Hero Trilogy.

Track listing

References 

1998 singles
2005 singles
2010 singles
Funker Vogt songs